Hang Lung Properties, formerly Amoy Properties and 
currently subsidiary of Hang Lung Group, is a property developer in Hong Kong. It is a member of Hang Seng Index Constituent Stocks (blue chip) and is headquartered in the Standard Chartered Bank Building in Central, Hong Kong.

History
Hang Lung Properties Limited was incorporated in 1949 and was taken over by Hang Lung Group Limited in 1980. It became the property investment arm of Hang Lung Group Limited after the group re-organisation in 1987. The company is led by Ronnie Chan.

In November 2010, the company said it was aiming to raise up to HK$10.1 billion through a share placement to finance expansion on the mainland.

Properties
The company's main properties include Standard Chartered Bank Building, Baskerville House, Hang Lung Centre in Causeway Bay, Kornhill Plaza, Grand Centre in Tsim Sha Tsui, as well as One and Two Grand Tower, Hollywood Plaza (Hong Kong), and the Park-In Commercial Centre in Mong Kok.

On 1 January 1991, Ronnie Chan took over as the group's chairman. He saw the opportunity to invest in mainland China market due to its economic growth, and thus the company began to venture into the mainland market under Chan's leadership. Its first step into the mainland came in 1992 with two landmark properties in Shanghai, Plaza 66 and Grand Gateway 66. Following the success of these projects, the company continued to expand into others parts of mainland China such as Shenyang, Jinan, Wuxi, Tianjin, Dalian, Kunming and Wuhan.

Hang Lung Properties in September 2020 bought the real estate assets in Hong Kong of the United States government.

Management Board
The board has eleven members, with five executive directors and six non-executive directors to ensure sufficient independence.

Chairman: Ronnie Chan
CEO: Weber Wai Pak Lo
CFO: Hau Cheong Ho
Executive Director: Adriel Wenbwo Chan

Non-executive directors:
Ronald Joseph Arculli
Philip Nan Lok Chen
Dominic Chiu Fai Ho
Nelson Wai Leung Yuen
Andrew Ka Ching Chan
Prof. Hsin Kang Chang
Anita Yuen Mei Fung

References

External links
 

Companies listed on the Hong Kong Stock Exchange
Land developers of Hong Kong
Real estate companies established in 1987
Companies in the Hang Seng Index
Hang Lung Group
Privately held companies of China